Yevgeni Korolyov may refer to:

 Evgeni Koroliov (born 1949), Russian pianist
 Evgeny Korolev (born 1988), Kazakhstani tennis player
 Evgeny Korolev (ice hockey) (born 1978), Russian ice hockey player

See also
 Korolyov (disambiguation)